West Hill School is a secondary academy, located in Stalybridge, Greater Manchester, England. Founded in 1927 as a school for only boys, the development in the Tameside borough has had multiple extensions and new buildings. included a new sports hall in 2004 (funded by the National Lottery), a new Resistant Materials/Religious education building in 2013 and a new English and Humanities block called The Hewitt Building in 2015, named in honour of Mr R.J.Hewitt, the school's former headteacher.

West Hill School is the second oldest school in the Tameside borough.

History 
West Hill School was formally a home. Home was owned by one Harrison family which was headed by Thomas Harrison. Thomas had four sons and one of them was named William Harrison. In 1922, William built West Hill and his brother Abel built Highfield House.

Later in the year (1922), West Hill was purchased by the corporation. On 24 March 1927, West Hill Council School (boys only school) was started with ten classrooms.

It became a Specialist Science College in September 2004.

On 1 August 2011, West Hill School officially gained academy status.

A notable former pupil is England U21 and Arsenal centre-back Rob Holding.

Ofsted Reports 
West Hill School has had many Ofsted ratings, across both its current academy status school and its previous state school status. Previously the school was rated inadequate and then requires improvement. The school is now classified as good, after improvements in all areas.

References

External links
School Website
Ofsted report

Educational institutions established in 1927
Boys' schools in Greater Manchester
1927 establishments in England
Secondary schools in Tameside
Academies in Tameside
Stalybridge